The flag of Gedo is used in Gedo, a region in Jubaland state of Somalia.

References

Gedo
Flags of Somalia
Flags introduced in 1998